El Ouatia, also known as Tan-Tan Plage (Tan-Tan Beach), is a town and municipality in Tan-Tan of the Guelmim-Oued Noun region of Morocco. At the time of the 2004 census, the commune had a total population of 6407 people living in 1592 households. It is one of Morocco's major fishing ports.

References

Populated places in Tan-Tan Province
Municipalities of Morocco